Geotrupes stercorarius is a species of earth-boring dung beetle, common name Dor.

The whole beetle is weakly lustrous and darkly colored, sometimes with a bluish sheen. The body shape is very compact and arched toward the top. On each elytron seven long rows of points are just visible. The head is clearly forward, and similar to a shovel in shape. The antennae are short and thicken into fans at the ends. On each leg there are numerous spikes.

The beetle is coprophagous, feeding on the droppings of herbivorous animals, and thus is found wherever cattle are kept. In the evenings, one can observe them closely circle around the animals on the ground. They create a chirping sound with their hind legs. From this the female digs side passages. Into each of these a piece of dung is brought, and an egg is laid. Afterwards, the chamber is closed off with more dung. The larvae which hatch from the eggs feed on the dung for a year, and then pupate. The adult beetles emerge from the pupae.

References
 Harde, Severa: Der Kosmos Käferführer, Die mitteleuropäischen Käfer, Stuttgart: Franckh-Kosmos Verlags-GmbH & Co, 2000, 
 Jiři Zahradnik, Irmgard Jung, Dieter Jung et al.: Käfer Mittel- und Nordwesteuropas, Berlin: Parey, 1985, 

Geotrupidae
Beetles of Europe
Beetles described in 1758
Taxa named by Carl Linnaeus
Coprophagous insects